Bracket are a Nigerian afropop and R&B music duo composed of Obumneme Ali a.k.a. "Smash" and Nwachukwu Ozioko a.k.a. "Vast". Bracket started as a three-man music group before a member called Bistop dropped out. The duo are currently signed to Ape Planet and are best known for releasing hit singles like "Happy Day", "Yori-Yori" and "Ada Owerri" which received several positive reviews and airplay.

Background
Vast and Smash grew up in Nsukka, Enugu State, where they used to attend campus shows while growing up. Vast has a diploma and a degree in Mass Communication from the Institute of Management Technology, Enugu and the University of Nigeria respectively while Smash has a diploma in Social Works and a degree in Psychology after graduating from the University of Nigeria, Nsukka.

The history of how the group began has been mixed in several stories and allegations. Bistop, a former member of the group claims to be the pioneer of the group after meeting Vast in a barbing salon back in 1999. They performed and attended several shows under a name called "Furious BV". In a press release, he said he left the group as a result of a collaborative effort of a former associate producer together with Vast and Smash. He also went on to claim that Smash was not a member of the group until 2003 after he met Smash through a friend.

Discography

Studio albums
 Happy Day (2006)
 Least Expected (2009)
 Cupid Stories (2011)
 Alive (2015)

Awards and nominations
In 2012, Bracket received an honorary award from the city of Philadelphia at the African American Museum in Philadelphia. Some of their awards include:

References

Musical groups established in 1999
21st-century Nigerian  male singers
Musical groups from Enugu
Nigerian boy bands
Living people
Igbo musical groups
Nigerian hip hop singers
Nigerian contemporary R&B musical groups
Nigerian musical duos
University of Nigeria alumni
Year of birth missing (living people)